Greece competed at the 2000 Summer Olympics in Sydney, Australia. Greek athletes have competed in every Summer Olympic Games. At the closing ceremony, a Greek segment was performed, as the country hosted the next Olympics in Athens four years later. Two Greek flags were also hoisted in preparation for the handover, with the Greek national anthem played twice.

Medalists
Greece finished in 17th position in the final medal rankings, with four gold medals and 13 medals overall. These were the most successful Olympic Games for Greece in which it was not the host nation.

Archery

Athletics

Men
Men's 100 m
 Georgios Theodoridis
 Round 1 – 10.34
 Round 2 – 10.29 (did not advance)

 Angelos Pavlakakis
 Round 1 – DNS (did not advance)

Men's 200 m
 Konstantinos Kenteris
 Round 1 – 20.57
 Round 2 – 20.14
 Semifinal – 20.2
 Final – 20.09 (gold medal)

 Anastasios Gousis
 Round 1 – 21.1 (did not advance)

 Alexios Alexopoulos
 Round 1 – DNS (did not advance)

Men's 400 m
 Anastasios Gousis
 Round 1 – 46.38 (did not advance)

Men's 800 m
 Panagiotis Stroubakos
 Round 1 – 01:47.96 (did not advance)

Men's 400 m Hurdles
 Periklis Iakovakis
 Round 1 – 50.2 (did not advance)

Men's 4 × 100 m
 Alexios Alexopoulos, Konstantinos Kenteris, Angelos Pavlakakis, Georgios Theodoridis
 Round 1 – 39.21
 Semifinal – 38.82 (did not advance)

Men's 4 × 400 m
 Stylianos Dimotsios, Anastasios Gousis, Periklis Iakovakis, Georgios Oikonomidis
 Round 1 – 03:06.50 (did not advance)

Men's 3,000 m Steeplechase
 Georgios Giannelis
 Round 1 – 09:19.14 (did not advance)

Men's Shot Put
 Vaios Tigkas
 Qualifying – 18.13 (did not advance)

Men's Javelin Throw
 Konstadinos Gatsioudis
 Qualifying – 88.41
 Final – 86.53 (6th place)

Men's Hammer Throw
 Alexandros Papadimitriou
 Qualifying – 76.61
 Final – 73.30 (12th place)

 Hristos Polihroniou
 Qualifying – 74.02 (did not advance)

Men's Long Jump
 Konstantinos Koukodimos
 Qualifying – 7.44 (did not advance)

 Dimitrios Serelis
 Qualifying – NM (did not advance)

Men's Triple Jump
 Hristos Meletoglou
 Qualifying – 16.00 (did not advance)

 Konstadinos Zalaggitis
 Qualifying – 14.15 (did not advance)

 Stamatios Lenis
 Qualifying – NM (did not advance)

Men's High Jump
 Lambros Papakostas
 Qualifying – DNS (did not advance)

Men's 50 km Walk
 Spyridon Kastanis
 Final – DNF

 Theodoros Stamatopoulos
 Final – DNF

Men's marathon
 Panayiotis Haramis
 Final – 2:26:55 (63rd place)

Men's Decathlon
 Prodromos Korkizoglou
 100 m – 10.74
 Long Jump – 7.16
 Shot Put – 13.70
 High Jump – 1.97
 400 m – 53.57
 100 m Hurdles – DNS
 Discus Throw – DNS
 Pole Vault – DNS

Women's Competition 
Women's 100 m
 Ekaterini Thanou
 Round 1 – 11.10
 Round 2 – 10.99
 Semifinal – 11.10
 Final – 11.12 (silver medal)

 Paraskevi Patoulidou
 Round 1 – 11.65 (did not advance)

Women's 200 m
 Ekaterini Koffa
 Round 1 – 23.53 (did not advance)

Women's 5,000 m
 Hrisostomia Iakovou
 Round 1 – 15:46.48 (did not advance)

Women's 10,000 m
 Hrisostomia Iakovou
 Round 1 – DNS (did not advance)

Women's 400 m Hurdles
 Chrysoula Gountenoudi
 Round 1 – 01:01.59 (did not advance)

Women's 4 × 100 m
 Ekaterini Koffa, Paraskevi Patoulidou, Effrosyni Patsou, Ekaterini Thanou
 Round 1 – 43.46
 Semifinal – 43.53 (did not advance)

Women's Shot Put
 Kalliopi Ouzouni
 Qualifying – 18.56
 Final – 18.63 (7th place)

Women's Discus
 Anastasia Kelesidou
 Qualifying – 63.64
 Final – 65.71 (silver medal)

 Styliani Tsikouna
 Qualifying – 61.59
 Final – 64.08 (5th place)

 Aikaterini Vongoli
 Qualifying – 61.29
 Final – 61.57 (9th place)

Women's Javelin Throw
 Mirella Maniani-Tzelili
 Qualifying – 63.34
 Final – 67.51 (silver medal)

 Angeliki Tsiolakoudi
 Qualifying – 58.11 (did not advance)

Women's Long Jump
 Niki Xanthou
 Qualifying – 6.50 (did not advance)

 Despoina Papavasilaki
 Qualifying – 5.86 (did not advance)

Women's Triple Jump
 Olga-Anastasia Vasdeki
 Qualifying – 14.26
 Final – 14.15 (7th place)

Women's High Jump
 Niki Bakogianni
 Qualifying – 1.80 (did not advance)

Women's Pole Vault
 Thalia Iakovidou
 Qualifying – NM (did not advance)

Women's 20 km Walk
 Athina Papayianni
 Final – 1:33:14 (11th place)

 Christina Kokotou
 Final – 1:38:52 (36th place)

Women's Heptathlon
 Asimina Vanakara
 100 m Hurdles – 14.19
 High Jump – 1.69
 Shot Put – 10.74
 200 m – 25.78
 Long Jump – NM
 Javelin Throw – DNS

Boxing

Men's Bantamweight (– 54 kg)
Artour Mikaelian
Round 1 – Lost to George Olteanu of Romania (did not advance)

Men's Lightweight (– 60 kg)
Tingran Ouzlian
Round 1 – Bye 
Round 2 – Defeated Asghar Ali Shah of Pakistan
Quarterfinal – Lost to Mario Kindelán of Cuba (did not advance)

Men's Middleweight (– 75 kg)
Antonios Giannoulas
Round 1 – Defeated Ottavio Barone of Italy
Round 2 – Lost to Jorge Gutiérrez of Cuba (did not advance)

Canoeing

Flatwater

Men's competition 
Men's Canoe Singles 500 m
 Andreas Kiligkaridis
 Qualifying Heat – 01:57.858 (did not advance)

Men's Canoe Singles 1000 m
 Andreas Kiligkaridis
 Qualifying Heat – 04:01.042
 Semifinal – DSQ (did not advance)

Cycling

Track Cycling 
Men's Sprint
Nikolaos Angelidis
Qualifying – 10.745
Repechage – 2nd place – Heat 3
First round – Lost to Florian Rousseau of France

Men's 1 km Time Trial
Dimitrios Georgalis
Final – 01:04.018 (6th place)

Men's Keirin
Lampros Vasilopoulos
First round – Heat – 1; Place – 4 (did not advance)
Repechage – Heat – 3; Place – 2 (did not advance)
Second round – Heat – 1; DNF (did not advance)

Men's Olympic Sprint
Lampros Vasilopoulos, Dimitrios Georgalis, Kleanthis Bargkas
Qualifying – 45.207
Second round – 45.079
Final – 45.332 (4th place)

Diving

Men's 3 Metre Springboard
 Thomas Bimis
 Preliminary – 324.72 (32nd place, did not advance)

Men's 3 Metre Springboard
 Nikolaos Siranidis
 Preliminary – 317.88 (36th place, did not advance)

Women's 3 Metre Springboard
 Sotiria Koutsopetrou
 Preliminary – 258.81 (21st place, did not advance)

Women's 10 Metre Platform
 Eftihia Pappa
 Preliminary – 236.79 (29th place, did not advance)

Women's 10 Metre Platform
 Maria Konstantatou
 Preliminary – 189.57 (38th place, did not advance)

Equestrianism

Gymnastics

Artistic

Rhythmic

Modern pentathlon

Greece sent only one pentathlete to the first Olympic women's competition.

Women's:
 Katalin Partics – 3700 pts, 22nd place

Rowing

Sailing

Greece sent seven men and four women to the Sailing competition at the 2000 Sydney Olympics.

Men

Women

Open

Shooting

Swimming

Men's 100 m Freestyle
 Spyridon Bitsakis
 Preliminary Heat – 51.28 (did not advance)

Men's 200 m Freestyle
 Dimitrios Manganas
 Preliminary Heat – 1:54.36 (did not advance)

Men's 400 m Freestyle
 Spyridon Gianniotis
 Preliminary Heat – 03:54.96 (did not advance)

Men's 1500 m Freestyle
 Spyridon Gianniotis
 Preliminary Heat – 15:29.69 (did not advance)

Men's 100 m Butterfly
 Ioannis Drymonakos
 Preliminary Heat – 56.36 (did not advance)

Men's 200 m Butterfly
 Ioannis Drymonakos
 Preliminary Heat – 02:00.75 (did not advance)

Men's 200 m Individual Medley
 Ioannis Kokkodis
 Preliminary Heat – 02:04.04 (did not advance)

Men's 400 m Individual Medley
 Ioannis Kokkodis
 Preliminary Heat – 04:23.19 (did not advance)

Men's 4 × 200 m Freestyle
 Spyridon Bitsakis, Spyridon Gianniotis, Dimitrios Manganas, Athanasios Oikonomou
 Preliminary Heat – 07:35.77 (did not advance)

Women's 50 m Freestyle
 Athina Bochori
 Preliminary Heat – 26.9 (did not advance)

Women's 100 m Freestyle
 Antonia Machaira
 Preliminary Heat – 57.24 (did not advance)

Women's 200 m Freestyle
 Zoi Dimoschaki
 Preliminary Heat – 02:04.06 (did not advance)

Women's 400 m Freestyle
 Artemis Dafni
 Preliminary Heat – 04:16.94 (did not advance)

Women's 800 m Freestyle
 Marianna Lymperta
 Preliminary Heat – 08:56.33 (did not advance)

Women's 100 m Butterfly
 Zampia Melachroinou
 Preliminary Heat – 01:02.06 (did not advance)

Women's 200 m Butterfly
 Zampia Melachroinou
 Preliminary Heat – 02:17.60 (did not advance)

Women's 100 m Backstroke
 Aikaterini Bliamou
 Preliminary Heat – 01:05.09 (did not advance)

Women's 200 m Backstroke
 Aikaterini Bliamou
 Preliminary Heat – 02:18.07 (did not advance)

Women's 200 m Individual Medley
 Aikaterini Sarakatsani
 Preliminary Heat – 02:23.05 (did not advance)

Women's 400 m Individual Medley
 Artemis Dafni
 Preliminary Heat – 04:53.52 (did not advance)

Synchronized swimming

Duet:
 Chiristina Thalassinnidou and Despina Theodoridou – 90.363 pts (13th place, did not advance)

Table tennis

Taekwondo

Men's Under 58 kg:
 Michail Mouroutsos – Gold medal
 Preminaly 1 – Defeated Talaat Abada of Egypt (5-0) 
 Preminaly 2 – Defeated Huan Chih-Hsiung of Chinese Taipei (2-1)
 Preminaly 3 – Defeated Gabriel Alberto Taraburelli of Argentina (2-1)
 Final – Defeated Gabriel Espareza of Spain (4-2)

Men's over 80 kg:
 Alexandros Nikolaidis 
 Preminaly 1 – Defeated Donald Ravenscroft of South Africa (WDR)
 Preminaly 2 – Lost to Milton Castro of Colombia (RSC)

Women's Under 57 kg:
 Areti Athanasopoulou
 Preminaly 1 – Defeated Shimaa Afifi of Egypt (7-7, SUP)
 Preminaly 2 – Lost to Virginia Lourens of Netherlands (6-8, PTS)

Tennis

Triathlon

Men's Individual Competition:
 Vassilis Krommidas – 1:51:28.94 (→ 33rd place)

Volleyball

Vasso Karadassiou and Efi Sfyri – 17th place (tied)

Water polo

Men Team Competition

Group B

Classification 9th-12th 

Team Roster
George Mavrotas
Filippos Kaiafas
Theodoros Lorantos
Konstantinos Loudis
Georgios Afroudakis
Thomas Khatzis
Theodoros Chatzitheodorou
Georgios Psykhos
Nikolaos Deligiannis
Dimitrios Mazis
Georgios Reppas
Ioannis Thomakos
Antonios Vlontakis

Weightlifting

Men

Women

Wrestling

Men

References

Olympedia
Wallechinsky, David (2004). The Complete Book of the Summer Olympics (Athens 2004 Edition). Toronto, Canada. . 
International Olympic Committee (2001). The Results. Retrieved 12 November 2005.
Sydney Organising Committee for the Olympic Games (2001). Official Report of the XXVII Olympiad Volume 1: Preparing for the Games. Retrieved 20 November 2005.
Sydney Organising Committee for the Olympic Games (2001). Official Report of the XXVII Olympiad Volume 2: Celebrating the Games. Retrieved 20 November 2005.
Sydney Organising Committee for the Olympic Games (2001). The Results. Retrieved 20 November 2005.
International Olympic Committee Web Site

Nations at the 2000 Summer Olympics
2000 Summer Olympics
Summer Olympics